Grand Central tram stop is a tram stop on the city-centre extension of Line 1 of the West Midlands Metro. It opened on 30 May 2016 as the terminus of the line on Stephenson Street outside the shopping centre from which its name was derived and Birmingham New Street station.

In October 2013 Birmingham City Council voted to extend the line, adding two additional stops beyond Grand Central, at Birmingham Town Hall and Library. This opened in December 2019. In July 2022 the line was further extended to Edgbaston Village.

References

External links

Transport infrastructure completed in 2016
West Midlands Metro stops